Hajjiabad-e Mir Hoseyni (also Romanized as Ḩājjīābād-e Mīr Ḩoseynī; also known as Ḩājjīābād) is a village in Aliabad Rural District, in the Central District of Anbarabad County, Kerman Province, Iran. At the 2006 census, its population was 533, in 110 families.

References 

Populated places in Anbarabad County